Extravehicular activity (EVA) is any activity done by an astronaut in outer space outside a spacecraft. In the absence of a breathable Earthlike atmosphere, the astronaut is completely reliant on a space suit for environmental support. EVA includes spacewalks and lunar or planetary surface exploration (commonly known from 1969 to 1972 as moonwalks). In a stand-up EVA (SEVA), an astronaut stands through an open hatch but does not fully leave the spacecraft. EVA has been conducted by the Soviet Union/Russia, the United States, Canada, the European Space Agency and China.

On March 18, 1965, Alexei Leonov became the first human to perform a spacewalk, exiting the Voskhod 2 capsule for 12 minutes and 9 seconds. On July 20, 1969, Neil Armstrong became the first human to perform a moonwalk, outside his lunar lander on Apollo 11 for 2 hours and 31 minutes.  On the last three Moon missions, astronauts also performed deep-space EVAs on the return to Earth, to retrieve film canisters from the outside of the spacecraft. American Astronauts Pete Conrad, Joseph Kerwin, and Paul Weitz also used EVA in 1973 to repair launch damage to Skylab, the United States' first space station.

EVAs may be either tethered (the astronaut is connected to the spacecraft; oxygen and electrical power can be supplied through an umbilical cable; no propulsion is needed to return to the spacecraft), or untethered. Untethered spacewalks were only performed on three missions in 1984 using the Manned Maneuvering Unit (MMU), and on a flight test in 1994 of the Simplified Aid For EVA Rescue (SAFER), a safety device worn on tethered U.S. EVAs.

Development history
NASA planners invented the term extravehicular activity (abbreviated with the acronym EVA) in the early 1960s for the Apollo program to land men on the Moon, because the astronauts would leave the spacecraft to collect lunar material samples and deploy scientific experiments. To support this, and other Apollo objectives, the Gemini program was spun off to develop the capability for astronauts to work outside a two-man Earth orbiting spacecraft. However, the Soviet Union was fiercely competitive in holding the early lead it had gained in crewed spaceflight, so the Soviet Communist Party, led by Nikita Khrushchev, ordered the conversion of its single-pilot Vostok capsule into a two- or three-person craft named Voskhod, in order to compete with Gemini and Apollo. The Soviets were able to launch two Voskhod capsules before U.S. was able to launch its first crewed Gemini.

The Voskhod's avionics required cooling by cabin air to prevent any kind of overheating, therefore an airlock was required for the spacewalking cosmonaut to exit and re-enter the cabin while it remained pressurized. Unusually, and by contrast, the Gemini avionics did not require air cooling, allowing the spacewalking astronaut to exit and re-enter the depressurized cabin through an open hatch. Because of this, the American and Soviet space programs developed different definitions for the duration of an EVA. The Soviet (now Russian) definition begins when the outer airlock hatch is open and the cosmonaut is in vacuum. An American EVA began when the astronaut had at least his head outside the spacecraft. The USA has changed its EVA definition since.

First spacewalk

The first EVA was performed on March 18, 1965, by Soviet cosmonaut Alexei Leonov, who spent 12 minutes and 9 seconds outside the Voskhod 2 spacecraft. Carrying a white metal backpack containing 45 minutes' worth of breathing and pressurization oxygen, Leonov had no means to control his motion other than pulling on his  tether. After the flight, he claimed this was easy, but his space suit ballooned from its internal pressure against the vacuum of space, stiffening so much that he could not activate the shutter on his chest-mounted camera.

He improperly entered the airlock head-first and got stuck sideways. He could not get back in without reducing the pressure in his suit, risking "the bends". It would be almost four years before the Soviets tried another EVA. They misrepresented to the press how difficult Leonov found it to work in weightlessness and concealed the problems encountered until after the end of the Cold War.

Project Gemini

The first American spacewalk was performed on June 3, 1965, by Ed White from the second crewed Gemini flight, Gemini IV, for 21 minutes. White was tethered to the spacecraft, and his oxygen was supplied through a  umbilical, which also carried communications and biomedical instrumentation. He was the first to control his motion in space with a Hand-Held Maneuvering Unit, which worked well but only carried enough propellant for 20 seconds. White found his tether useful for limiting his distance from the spacecraft but difficult to use for moving around, contrary to Leonov's claim. However, a defect in the capsule's hatch latching mechanism caused difficulties opening and closing the hatch, which delayed the start of the EVA and put White and his crewmate at risk of not getting back to Earth alive.

No EVAs were planned on the next three Gemini flights. The next EVA was planned to be made by David Scott on Gemini VIII, but that mission had to be aborted due to a critical spacecraft malfunction before the EVA could be conducted. Astronauts on the next three Gemini flights (Eugene Cernan, Michael Collins, and Richard Gordon), performed several EVAs, but none was able to successfully work for long periods outside the spacecraft without tiring and overheating. Cernan attempted but failed to test an Air Force Astronaut Maneuvering Unit which included a self-contained oxygen system.

On November 13, 1966, Edwin "Buzz" Aldrin became the first to successfully work in space without tiring during Gemini XII, the last Gemini mission. Aldrin worked outside the spacecraft for 2 hours and 6 minutes, in addition to two stand-up EVAs in the spacecraft hatch for an additional 3 hours and 24 minutes. Aldrin's interest in scuba diving inspired the use of underwater EVA training to simulate weightlessness, which has been used ever since to allow astronauts to practice techniques of avoiding wasted muscle energy.

First EVA crew transfer
On January 16, 1969, Soviet cosmonauts Aleksei Yeliseyev and Yevgeny Khurnov transferred from Soyuz 5 to Soyuz 4, which were docked together. This was the second Soviet EVA, and it would be almost another nine years before the Soviets performed their third.

Apollo lunar EVA

American astronauts Neil Armstrong and Buzz Aldrin performed the first EVA on the lunar surface on July 21, 1969 (UTC), after landing their Apollo 11 Lunar Module spacecraft. This first Moon walk, using self-contained portable life support systems, lasted 2 hours and 36 minutes. A total of fifteen Moon walks were performed among six Apollo crews, including Charles "Pete" Conrad, Alan Bean, Alan Shepard, Edgar Mitchell, David Scott, James Irwin, John Young, Charles Duke, Eugene Cernan, and Harrison "Jack" Schmitt. Cernan was the last Apollo astronaut to step off the surface of the Moon.

Apollo 15 command module pilot Al Worden made an EVA on August 5, 1971, on the return trip from the Moon, to retrieve a film and data recording canister from the service module. He was assisted by Lunar Module Pilot James Irwin standing up in the Command Module hatch. This procedure was repeated by Ken Mattingly and Charles Duke on Apollo 16, and by Ronald Evans and Harrison Schmitt on Apollo 17.

Post-Apollo EVAs
The first EVA repairs of a spacecraft were made by Charles "Pete" Conrad, Joseph Kerwin, and Paul J. Weitz on May 26, June 7, and June 19, 1973, on the Skylab 2 mission. They rescued the functionality of the launch-damaged Skylab space station by freeing a stuck solar panel, deploying a solar heating shield, and freeing a stuck circuit breaker relay. The Skylab 2 crew made three EVAs, and a total of ten EVAs were made by the three Skylab crews. They found that activities in weightlessness required about 2 times longer than on Earth because many astronauts suffered spacesickness early in their flights.

After Skylab, no more EVAs were made by the United States until the advent of the Space Shuttle program in the early 1980s. In this period, the Soviets resumed EVAs, making four from the Salyut 6 and Salyut 7 space stations between December 20, 1977, and July 30, 1982.

When the United States resumed EVAs on April 7, 1983, astronauts started using an Extravehicular Mobility Unit (EMU) for self-contained life support independent of the spacecraft. STS-6 was the first Space Shuttle mission during which a spacewalk was conducted. Also, for the first time, American astronauts used an airlock to enter and exit the spacecraft like the Soviets. Accordingly, the American definition of EVA start time was redefined to when the astronaut switches the EMU to battery power.

Numerous EVAs were conducted during the assembly of the ISS, often using the Quest Joint Airlock, designed to support both US EMUs, and Russian Orlan space suits.

Chinese EVA
China became the third country to independently carry out an EVA on September 27, 2008, during the Shenzhou 7 mission. Chinese taikonaut Zhai Zhigang completed a 22-minute spacewalk wearing the Chinese-developed Feitian space suit, with taikonaut Liu Boming wearing the Russian-derived Orlan space suit assisting him in the process. Zhai completely exited the craft, while Liu stood by at the airlock, straddling the portal.

Since 2021, China has carried out several more extravehicular activities lasting several hours for the construction of the Tiangong space station.

Milestones

Capability milestones
 The first untethered spacewalk was made by American Bruce McCandless II on February 7, 1984, during the Space Shuttle Challenger mission STS-41-B, using the Manned Maneuvering Unit. He was subsequently joined by Robert L. Stewart during the 5-hour, 55-minute spacewalk. A self-contained spacewalk was first attempted by Eugene Cernan in 1966 on Gemini 9A, but Cernan could not reach the maneuvering unit without tiring.
 The first metalwork in open space, consisting of welding, brazing and metal spraying, was conducted by Soviet cosmonauts Svetlana Savitskaya and Vladimir Dzhanibekov on July 25, 1984. A specially designed multipurpose tool was used to perform these activities during a 3-hour, 30-minute EVA outside the Salyut 7 space station.
 The first three-person EVA was performed on May 13, 1992, as the third EVA of STS-49, the maiden flight of Endeavour. Pierre Thuot, Richard Hieb, and Thomas Akers conducted the EVA to hand-capture and repair a non-functional Intelsat VI-F3 satellite.  it was the only three-person EVA.
 The first EVA to perform an in-flight repair of the Space Shuttle was by American Steve Robinson on August 3, 2005, during "Return to Flight" mission STS-114. Robinson was sent to remove two protruding gap fillers from Discovery's heat shield, after engineers determined there was a small chance they could affect the shuttle upon re-entry. Robinson successfully removed the loose material while Discovery was docked to the International Space Station.
 The longest EVA performed as of January 2022, was 8 hours and 56 minutes, performed by Susan Helms and James S. Voss on March 11, 2001.

Personal cumulative duration records
 Russian Anatoly Solovyev holds both the record for most EVAs and for the greatest cumulative duration spent in EVA (16 EVAs; 82 hr and 22 min).
 Michael Lopez-Alegria holds the American record (10 EVAs; 67 hr and 40 min).
 Thomas Pesquet holds the European (and non-US/Russian) record (6 EVAs; 39 hr and 54 min).
 Peggy Whitson holds the record for most EVAs and most cumulative duration spent for a woman (10 EVAs, 60 hr and 21 min).

National, ethnic and gender firsts
 The first woman to perform an EVA was Soviet Svetlana Savitskaya on July 25, 1984, while aboard the Salyut 7 space station. Her EVA lasted 3 hours and 35 minutes.
 The first American woman to perform an EVA was Kathryn D. Sullivan on October 11, 1984.
 The first two women to perform an EVA together and the first all-female EVA team were Christina Koch and Jessica Meir on October 18, 2019, during Expedition 61 on the International Space Station.
 The first female Asian and Chinese woman to perform an EVA was Wang Yaping on 8 November 2021, outside the Chinese Tiangong space station.
 The first Native American woman to perform a space walk was Nicole Aunapu Mann on January 20, 2023, during Expedition 68 on the International Space Station.
 The first EVA by a non-Soviet, non-American was made on December 9, 1988, by Jean-Loup Chrétien of France during a three-week stay on the Mir space station.
 The first EVA by a black African-American was on February 9, 1995, by Bernard A. Harris Jr.
 The first EVA by a Japanese astronaut was made on November 25, 1997, by Takao Doi during STS-87.
 The first EVA by a Swiss astronaut was made on December 23, 1999, by Claude Nicollier during STS-103.
 The first EVA by an Australian-born person was on March 13, 2001, by Andy Thomas (although he is a naturalized US citizen).
The first EVA by a Canadian astronaut was made on April 22, 2001, by Chris Hadfield along with NASA astronaut Scott Parazynski during mission STS-100 to install Canadarm2 on the International Space Station.
 The first EVA by a Scandinavian astronaut was made on December 12, 2006, by Christer Fuglesang.
 The first EVA by a Chinese astronaut was made on September 27, 2008, by Zhai Zhigang during Shenzhou 7 mission. The spacewalk, using a Feitian space suit, made China the third country to independently carry out an EVA.
 The first EVA by an Italian astronaut was made on July 9, 2013, by Luca Parmitano along with NASA Astronaut Chris Cassidy during Expedition 36 on the International Space Station.
 The first EVA by a British astronaut was on January 15, 2016, by Tim Peake.
 Although British-American Michael Foale carried out an EVA on February 9, 1995, he flew as an American astronaut in NASA's program.

Commemoration
The first spacewalk, made by Soviet cosmonaut Alexei Leonov, was commemorated in 1965 with several Eastern Bloc stamps (see Alexei Leonov#Stamps). Since the Soviet Union did not publish details of the Voskhod spacecraft at the time, the spaceship depiction in the stamps was purely fictional.

The U.S. Post Office issued a postage stamp in 1967 commemorating Ed White's first American spacewalk. The engraved image has an accurate depiction of the Gemini IV spacecraft and White's space suit.

Designations
NASA "spacewalkers" during the Space Shuttle program were designated as EV-1, EV-2, EV-3 and EV-4 (assigned to mission specialists for each mission, if applicable).

Camp-out procedure
For EVAs from the International Space Station, NASA employed a camp-out procedure to reduce the risk of decompression sickness. This was first tested by the Expedition 12 crew. Spending a night at the lower air pressure helps flush nitrogen from the body, thereby preventing "the bends". More recently astronauts have been using the In-Suit Light Exercise protocol rather than camp-out to prevent decompression sickness.

See also 

 List of cumulative spacewalk records
 List of International Space Station spacewalks
 List of Mir spacewalks
 List of spacewalkers
 List of spacewalks since 2015
 List of spacewalks 2000–2014
 List of spacewalks and moonwalks 1965–1999
 Omega Speedmaster
 Suitport
 The Age of Pioneers, 2017 film about the first spacewalk

References

External links

 NASA JSC Oral History Project Walking to Olympus: An EVA Chronology PDF document.
 Astronaut space walk picture
 NASDA Online Space Notes
 Apollo Extravehicular mobility unit. Volume 1: System description – 1971 (PDF document)
 Apollo Extravehicular mobility unit. Volume 2: Operational procedures – 1971 (PDF document)
 Skylab Extravehicular Activity Development Report – 1974 (PDF document)
 Analysis of the Space Shuttle Extravehicular Mobility Unit – 1986 (PDF document)
 NASA Space Shuttle EVA tools and equipment reference book – 1993 (PDF document)
 Preparing for an American EVA on the ISS – 2006

 
Human spaceflight
Articles containing video clips